The city of Ottawa, Canada held municipal elections on December 4, 1939.

Mayor of Ottawa

Plebiscite

Ottawa Board of Control
(4 elected)

Ottawa City Council
2 elected from each ward

References
Ottawa Citizen, December 4, 1939

Municipal elections in Ottawa
1939 elections in Canada
1930s in Ottawa
1939 in Ontario
December 1939 events